Gallows Bay may refer to:
 Gallows Bay, Christiansted, United States Virgin Islands
 Gallows Bay, Oranjestad, Netherlands Antilles